Vast Countenance is a rock 'n' folk band from Volendam, the Netherlands, founded in 1999. Vast Countenance toured the Netherlands and the United States. Its albums have been released in several countries.

Biography

Start off
Vast Countenance was formed in 1999 with the objective to bring forth own music. Almost all members originate from the cover band Sister Ray (founded on 31 December 1996) – Cor Bond and Simon Tol didn't come along. Members continue playing in Sister Ray as well, though, sometimes during one same appearance.

The name of the band was invented by the first lead singer, Mario Reurs. For the group members it is an English translation without an additional meaning. They don't link it to Kabbalah of which they initially had never heard of (i.e. in Kabbalah 'Vast Countenance' is the first sephira). The song Sister Ray of Velvet Underground has been the inspiration for the name of their other band.

Still quite at the beginning, Johan Molenaar replaced Reurs as the lead singer of the band. In 2004 Vast Countenance released its first album, a demo version that carries the name of the band and contains nine own compositions. The CD was well received and the genre was at that time described by the newspaper Noord Hollands Dagblad as "Beatle-style pop with a whiff of rock 'n' roll.

Influences and music style 
Vast Countenance's music genre has changed slightly in course of time. It has been qualified by some as part-sung alternative rock and Britpop, as well as a mixture between indie rock and folk by others. Meanwhile it has developed into rock 'n' folk. It combines influences from the 1960s with a contemporary sound, and finds inspiration in the music of The Beatles, Bob Dylan, Crosby, Stills, Nash & Young, and Velvet Underground, as well as from songwriters like Tim Buckley and Neil Young.

The band only produces self written music. Most songs originate from a guitar chords composition of Molenaar, on the basis of which the group writes its songs together. The part sung choirs of the first two albums have been arranged by Nico Tol (Stein). During studio sessions afterwards, the songs are shaped into their final settings.

Reception
In 2006 the music group released its album As We Please in the Netherlands, United States and Japan. The album contained seven newly written songs and three make overs of the first album which were described by the Dutch music magazine LiveXS as "a fresh sounding melody machine." The song Clay was released as a single too. Guest appearances on the album were from Peter Bien (trumpet) and Jozef Veerman (keyboards).

OOR Magazine reviewed the band in 2007 as follows: "From the region of Waterland surprisingly Dutch talent comes sailing along ... 'We're all jugglers juggling with, the endless possibilities of life' is just one of the simple, but pretty formed sentences on the album. The pliant, sunny melodies and beautiful part-sung choirs  link up seamlessly with the texts. Extra little points deserve the strong choruses, unexpected transitions and the special singing. Pop as pop is meant to be." OOR was critical on the recording quality of the demo version.

Seattle and San Francisco 
In 2008 As We Please got the attention of American music promoter Michael Sudden. He introduced the band to some radio stations around Seattle that resulted in airplay, and in reviews in magazines subsequently. In November of the same year the band traveled along the West Coast during two weeks, where it performed in two clubs in Seattle, and finished its tour with street performances in San Francisco. It received positive reviews, such as "Dutch group Vast Countenance gives '60s rock a breathtaking makeover."

2010s 
In 2011 the music group released its album Elephant Child. As a result of the joining of violinist Anne Veerman to the band, the genre can definitely be defined as rock 'n' folk. In its review, the Noord Hollands Dagblad regards the song Not A Bad Moment as world class, with further comments like "One by one strong songs ... inimitable melody lines ... really brilliant."

Ten songs of Vast Countenance reached the Volendammer Top 1000, an all-time list that was compiled in 2013 by the listeners of 17 regional radio- and television stations.

Cor Schilder (Pan), drummer and one of the singers in the band, was killed on 17 July 2014, when Malaysia Airlines Flight 17 was shot down above Ukraine.

Members 
The following lists show permanent members. The group invites guest musicians on a regular basis as well.

Current members
 Johan Molenaar – bass guitar, vocals
 Anne Veerman – violin
 Jack Tuyp (Kip) – guitar
 Pascal Voorn – guitar, vocals
 Christiaan Veerman – keyboards, piano

Past members
 Mario Reurs – vocals 
 Nico Tol (Stein) – guitar, vocals 
 Cor Schilder (Pan) – drums, vocals

Discography

Albums 
 2004: Vast Countenance (demo)
 2006: As We Please
 2011: Elephant Child
 2015: With Muffled Drum

Dvd 
 2009: Love Acoustic

Further reading 
 1WayWind The Magazine, No. 15 (Febr. 2007) and No. 22 (June 2009) (interviews)

References

External links 

1999 establishments in the Netherlands
Dutch alternative rock groups
Dutch folk music groups
Dutch indie rock groups
Musical groups established in 1999